Arthur Terdich was an Australian racing driver. He won the 1929 Australian Grand Prix driving a supercharged Bugatti Type 37A.

References

Australian racing drivers
Grand Prix drivers
Year of death missing